Rudolf Otto von Büren (born 19 September 1822 in Bern - died 25 December 1888 in Bern) was a Swiss politician who served as the fourth mayor of Bern.

Personal life 
Otto von Büren came from the patrician family von Büren. He followed education at private schools and followed further education at the university of Bern. He studied history and law in Bern and Neuchatel. He then spent a long time abroad and settled in the family castle on the family estate for a while. He married Henriette von Sinner.

Political career 
Von Büren was a member of the Grand Council of the Canton of Bern from 1850 to 1864 and a member of the National Council (lower house of the federal parliament) from 1864 to 1884. He belonged to the Protestant conservative opposition and worked closely with the Catholic conservative opposition. For years he was the only conservative in the canton of Bern in the National Council.

He opposed the (Kulturkampf) and was an opponent of the Poor Law, because he had always been in favor of private care for the poor. He also represented federal positions and stood against the Radical Party (forerunner of today's Liberal Democratic Party). He maintained friendly contacts with leading Roman Catholic politicians from Switzerland and the envoys of the conservative monarchies.

He held numerous positions within the Reformed Church of Switzerland. His faith was a guideline for his charitable actions. From 1870 to 1871 he led the Swiss aid organization in support of the people of the besieged Strasbourg. He also held posts in the International Evangelical Alliance.

Von Büren became Mayor (Gemeindepräsident) of Bern in 1864. He had built a new system of water and gas in the city of Bern during his time in office. In 1871 the name of Gemeindepräsident changed to Stadtpräsident. He died in office on Christmas Day 1888 in Bern.

See also 
 List of mayors of Bern

References

Mayors of Bern
1822 births
1888 deaths